Swing, Brother, Swing is a detective novel by Ngaio Marsh; it is the fifteenth novel to feature Roderick Alleyn, and was first published in 1949.  The plot concerns the murder of a big band accordionist in London; the novel was published as A Wreath for Rivera in the United States.

Plot
Its opening chapter a series of sharply contrasting letters, telegrams and gossip column press items, the novel soon brings together its cast of characters at the Belgravia home (Duke's Gate, London SW1) of the eccentric, outrageous Lord Pastern & Bagott, his long-suffering, coiffed and corseted French wife Lady Cécile and her daughter by a previous marriage Félicité (Fée) de Suze. Apart from the extensive domestic staff and Lady Pastern's companion-secretary Miss Henderson, we meet a family cousin Hon. Edward Manx and Lord Pastern's niece Carlisle Wayne, returning from war work overseas to be reunited with a family she now observes with affectionate irritation and cool detachment. The plot's two drivers are a (mysteriously owned and edited) vogueish magazine Harmony with an agony column signed by the anonymous GPF ('Guide, Philosopher, Friend') and the almost certifiable Lord Pastern's latest enthusiasm to play percussion in Breezy Bellairs' swing band, resident at the fashionable Metronome nightclub run by Caesar Bonn. His lordship has composed a novelty number 'Hot Guy, Hot Gunner' to feature himself as drummer in the band, to the disgust of the professional band players, whose introduction at Duke's Gate to rehearse in the ballroom and join the appalled Lady Pastern's dinner table, leads to a burgeoning affair between the feckless Fée and Carlos Rivera, the band's South American (inevitably) accordionist star and ladies' man. The family party attend his lordship's debut at The Metronome, where the novelty numbers, including 'The Peanut Vendor', 'The Umbrella Man' and 'Hot Guy, Hot Gunner' are to culminate with Rivera being 'shot dead' by a dummy firearm from Lord P on drumkit, then to be carried off with a wreath and cod funeral march 'in the Breezy Bellairs Manner'... and, of course, Rivera is found to be dead in fact, shot in the heart by a sort of DIY mini-harpoon constructed by Lord P from his infuriated wife's parasol-shaft and one of her embroidery stilettos.

Summoned from Scotland Yard, Inspector Fox arrives to investigate, only to find his superior Chief Superintendent Roderick Alleyn and his wife, the painter Agatha Troy, have been (most improbably) among The Metronome's patrons that evening; and the detection starts, first at the club, where a sub-plot about drugs and blackmail swirls about Breezy Bellairs, his band and Caesar Bonn himself, then at Duke's Gate and the Harmony office in the city, before Alleyn solves the mystery and identifies the unlamented Carlos Rivera's murderer. Along the way, we have the final appearance of Alleyn's pre-War 'Watson', the facetious journalist Nigel Bathgate of the Evening Chronicle, and learn that Troy is pregnant (when Alleyn coyly tells his sidekick Fox he is to be a godfather). This will be Alleyn and Troy's only child, Ricky, who first appears as a six-year-old boy in the 1954 novel Spinsters in Jeopardy.

Background and commentary
It is hard to believe that this novel was not written in the 1930s in which it is all too clearly set, despite Ngaio Marsh's introduction of the post-War perspective of characters such as Ned Manx, the Australian (left-wing) band drummer Syd Skelton and, above all, Carlisle Wayne, whose cool observation of the Pastern & Bagott mis-en-scene contains a new element of criticism of the High Society shenanigans of her relatives. When Marsh wrote the book (1948) in New Zealand, she had not visited England for ten years, spending the War years at her home in Christchurch, where she had written two of her most interesting, New Zealand-set novels Colour Scheme and Died in the Wool. In 1948, according to her first biographer Margaret Lewis, she was coping with the recent death of the widowed father she had lived with and looked after, and was much pre-occupied with her efforts to re-energise New Zealand's theatrical life, following the inspiring recent visit of The Old Vic Company led by Laurence Olivier and Vivien Leigh, whom Marsh had hosted and entertained. This would in turn inspire her next novel, Opening Night.

'Although [ Marsh ] attempts to give the novel a contemporary feel,' writes Dr Lewis, 'with references to food rationing, six-year-old dresses and the "exhausted aftermath" of the war, it is clearly based on her pre-war memories of London, where she danced at nightclubs like "The Metronome" with the Rhodes [ an aristocratic family of lifelong friends ]. Ngaio had not visited England for eleven years, and this is quite apparent in her approach. The plot is weak and trivial... and in comparison to the originality of her New Zealand-based novels, Swing, Brother, Swing appears a retrograde step.'

Marsh's later biographer Joanne Drayton is equally unenthusiastic about 'a formulaic book' in which Marsh 'fell back on what she knew to produce something that bordered on the hackneyed', referring to an aristocratic ambience, characters and themes that are 'anachronistic comic cliché straight out of Ngaio's property box of 1930s characters', seeing 'no place in post-war Britain for [ Lord ] Pastern's hedonism... Even Ngaio's humour falters in the face of his selfish stupidity... The wreath for Rivera is really Pastern's.' Drayton nevertheless praises Marsh's writing in the novel, which 'retained a vibrancy that still made it creditable. It was testimony to her professionalism that, in spite of her intense workload and personal loss, she produced a book that sold well.'

Drayton interestingly draws a parallel between Marsh's fictional Breezy Bellairs Boys and the real American band, Spike Jones & His City Slickers, whose novelty numbers and zany spoof versions of ballads were popular in the 1940s. Readers enjoying Swing, Brother, Swing will appreciate it best as a lighthearted throwback to the 1930s society world of the English upper classes Ngaio Marsh so convincingly described in her 1938 Death in a White Tie. Her next novels, starting with Opening Night were to develop her Roderick Alleyn mysteries into new territory within the classic whodunit format.

References 

Roderick Alleyn novels
1949 British novels
Novels set in London
Collins Crime Club books
British detective novels
British mystery novels